The 2014–15 season was Football Club Internazionale Milano's 106th in existence and 99th consecutive season in the top flight of Italian football. The team took part at Serie A, Coppa Italia and UEFA Europa League.

Season overview
During the summer of 2014, Inter was left by the main protagonists of the 2009–10 Treble: the captain Javier Zanetti, Walter Samuel, Esteban Cambiasso and Diego Milito. Therefore, the only left of that season were Joel Obi and Rene Krhin, both returning from loan. The renewal signed by Walter Mazzarri added to the arrivals of new men (Gary Medel, Pablo Osvaldo, Yann M'Vila, Dodô and Nemanja Vidić) and several years without trophies helped the fans to predict a "year zero" for their club. The new era started on 20 August when, in the first leg of the Europa League play-off, Inter beat Stjarnan 3–0. The second leg match resulted in another large win of 6–0: Kovačić unlocked his record, scoring half of the goals. The results of Serie A were - instead - disappointing, except the 7–0 win over Sassuolo. Inter lost with Cagliari and Fiorentina, suffering a total of seven goals. Mazzarri put his job at risk due to a quarrel with Massimo Moratti, stating that "he didn't have time to waste". Despite a good European campaign, with eight points collected in four matches of the group stage, the coach was fired after a 2–2 draw with Hellas Verona. Erick Thohir bet on Roberto Mancini, who coached the side from 2004 to 2008 winning the Italian title for three consecutive years. Mancini made his debut in the Derby della Madonnina (1–1), then reached the European knockout phase on his fiftieth birthday. However, the gap with other opponents was unattainable at mid-season.

Mancini tried to resolve the problem of a team not built by him with new purchases (Podolski, Shaqiri and Brozović) and a policy based on young players such as Pușcaș, Bonazzoli, Gnoukouri, Donkor and Dimarco: however Inter had poor results, being defeated in both cups (Coppa Italia and Europa League). The attempt of getting a placement useful for European competitions failed in final matches, sticking Inter at eighth position. Icardi's goals - that crowned him Serie A top scorer - were not enough to save the season.

Kit 
Supplier: Nike / Sponsor: Pirelli

Kit information
The new home kit is black with a thin blue pinstripe and also boasts a new enlarged and enhanced club crest. The club crest – in the version with the star on the top – will be present exclusively on the jersey. The shirt has a tailored black collar with a thin blue trim, which has a button at the top, and a placket with a hidden button. Inside the back of the neck is a pennant tab featuring the Saint George’s cross to represent the city of Milan’s coat of arms. On the back of the neck is "Inter" in a specially designed font, which has been used by the Nerrazzurri's most committed fans on flags and banners inside the San Siro since the 1970s. The new home shorts are black with a thin blue stripe along each side, and the new home socks are black with a wide tonal stripe of chevrons on the back. The new away kit has a ribbed crew neck collar and is white with a tonal light grey graphic on the front consisting of lines which create a Saint George's cross from the city of Milan's coat of arms. Inside the back of the neck is a pennant tab featuring the proud message "Milano E’ Solo Inter" (Milan is only Inter). It is written in a specially designed font. On the back of the neck is another Saint George's cross to once again proudly represent the city of Milan's coat of arms. The new away kit is completed by white shorts and socks.

Pre-season and friendlies

Pinzolo training camp

International Champions Cup

Other friendlies

Competitions

Overview

Serie A

League table

Results summary

Results by round

Matches

Coppa Italia

UEFA Europa League

Play-off round

Group stage

Knockout phase

Round of 32

Round of 16

Statistics

Appearances and goals

|-
! colspan="12" style="background:#dcdcdc; text-align:center"| Goalkeepers

|-
! colspan="12" style="background:#dcdcdc; text-align:center"| Defenders

|-
! colspan="12" style="background:#dcdcdc; text-align:center"| Midfielders

|-
! colspan="12" style="background:#dcdcdc; text-align:center"| Forwards

|-
! colspan="12" style="background:#dcdcdc; text-align:center"| Players transferred out during the season

Goalscorers
{| class="wikitable sortable" style="font-size: 95%; text-align: center;"
|-
!width="7%"|No.
!width="7%"|Pos.
!width="7%"|Nation
!width="20%"|Name
!Serie A
!Coppa Italia
!Europa League
!Total
|-
| 9
| FW
| 
| Mauro Icardi
| 22 
| 1 
| 4 
|27 
|-
| 8
| FW
| 
| Rodrigo Palacio
| 8 
| 0 
| 4 
|12 
|-
| 10
| MF
| 
| Mateo Kovačić
| 5 
| 0 
| 3 
|8 
|-
| 7
| FW
| 
| Dani Osvaldo
| 5 
| 0 
| 2 
|7 
|-
| 13
| MF
| 
| Fredy Guarín
| 6 
| 0 
| 1 
|7 
|-
| 88
| MF
| 
| Hernanes
| 5 
| 0 
| 0 
|5 
|-
| 33
| DF
| 
| Danilo D'Ambrosio
| 0 
| 0 
| 3 
|3 
|-
| 91
| MF
| 
| Xherdan Shaqiri
| 1 
| 1 
| 1 
|3 
|-
| 22
| DF
| 
| Dodô
| 0 
| 0 
| 2 
|2 
|-
| 23
| DF
| 
| Andrea Ranocchia
| 2 
| 0 
| 0 
|2 
|-
| 11
| FW
| 
| Lukas Podolski
| 1 
| 0 
| 0 
|1 
|-
| 15
| DF
| 
| Nemanja Vidić
| 1 
| 0 
| 0 
|1 
|-
| 17
| MF
| 
| Zdravko Kuzmanović
| 0 
| 0 
| 1 
|1 
|-
| 20
| MF
| 
| Joel Obi
| 1 
| 0 
| 0 
|1 
|-
| 77
| MF
| 
| Marcelo Brozović
| 1 
| 0 
| 0 
|1 
|-
| #
| colspan=3 | Own goals
| 1 
| 0 
| 0 
|1 
|-
|- bgcolor="F1F1F1" 
| colspan=4 | TOTAL
| 59 
| 2  
| 21 
| 82

References

Inter Milan seasons
Internazionale
Internazionale